Right Stuf Inc. (formerly known as The Right Stuf International Inc.) is an American video publisher and distributor of video programming that specializes in Asian entertainment (anime and live action films). The company since 2022 is owned by Crunchyroll, a joint venture run by Sony through its Sony Pictures and Sony Music Entertainment Japan divisions, with the latter company running it via Aniplex. It has several divisions including: Nozomi Entertainment (production), RightStufAnime.com (online store) and 5 Points Pictures (live action). In March 2012, Right Stuf launched 5 Points Pictures, its live action label. Right Stuf also offers production services and distribution for Japanese labels Sunrise Inc., Eleven Arts, Pony Canyon, and its corporate sibling, Aniplex of America.

Right Stuf was founded on July 31, 1987, by Robert "Todd" Ferson and Shawne P. Kleckner. The company is headquartered in Grimes, Iowa. The company's e-commerce site at www.rightstufanime.com is the largest independent seller of anime, manga, and Japanese collectibles in North America. On August 4, 2022, Right Stuf was acquired by Sony, and made a part of the Crunchyroll brand. As a result of the acquisition, Right Stuf ceased distribution of all hentai content on its storefronts, for which it and Crunchyroll drew criticism from fans. Prior to the acquisition, Crunchyroll, then known as Funimation, had partnered with its subsidiary Nozomi Entertainment to stream its select titles on the FunimationNOW app in 2019. 

On December 8, 2022, Kleckner said that he would be leaving the company after 35 years of being its co-founder and CEO.

Current divisions

Nozomi Entertainment

Nozomi Entertainment is Right Stuf's studio focusing on "collector-grade releases for audiences of all ages." It publishes classic and modern anime programs for people of all ages. At the Anime Expo in 2007, CEO Shawne Kleckner announced that Right Stuf had changed the name of their production division to Nozomi Entertainment. The first title released under the new Nozomi Entertainment label was The Third. Some titles are licensed previously under the Lucky Penny Entertainment label before it was discontinued.

 A.D. Police: To Protect and Serve (license rescued from ADV Films)
 Adolescence of Utena (license rescued from Central Park Media)
 Ah My Buddha (previously under the Lucky Penny label, license rescued from Media Blasters)
 Aoi Hana: Sweet Blue Flowers (previously under the Lucky Penny label)
 Aria (dub funded at Kickstarter)
 Astro Boy (license rescued from NBC Enterprises)
 Blessings of the Campanella (previously under the Lucky Penny label, license rescued from Funimation)
 Boogiepop Phantom
 Boogiepop Phantom and Others (live-action film; anime licensed by Crunchyroll and Funimation)
 Dirty Pair (everything except TV series and From Lovely Angels with Love was license rescued from ADV Films; Affair on Nolandia was license rescued from Streamline Pictures; TV series English dub funded at Kickstarter)
 Dirty Pair: Project Eden (license rescued from ADV Films)
 Dirty Pair Flash (license rescued from ADV Films)
 El-Hazard: The Magnificent World (license rescued from Geneon)
 El-Hazard: The Magnificent World 2 (license rescued from Geneon)
 El-Hazard: The Wanderers (license rescued from Geneon)
 El-Hazard: The Alternative World (license rescued from Geneon)
 Emma: A Victorian Romance (dub funded at Kickstarter)
 Gakuen Alice
 Galaxy Angel (everything except X was license rescued from Bandai Entertainment; Rune was license rescued from Bandai Visual USA)
 Gekiganger III
 Gravitation (noted Aniplex master license)
 His and Her Circumstances
 The Irresponsible Captain Tylor
 Junjo Romantica: Pure Romance (co-license with Kadokawa Pictures USA; Funimation has the streaming rights to season 3)
 Kimba the White Lion (license rescued from NBC Enterprises)
 Looking Up at the Half-Moon (previously under the Lucky Penny label, license rescued from Crimson Star Media)
 Lost Universe (license rescued from ADV Films)
 Macross 7 (home video distribution for Big West)
 Macross Delta (home video distribution for Big West)
 Macross Frontier (home video distribution for Big West)
 Mai Mai Miracle
 Magic User's Club (license rescued from Media Blasters)
 Martian Successor Nadesico (license rescued from ADV Films)
 Martian Successor Nadesico: The Motion Picture – Prince of Darkness (license rescued from ADV Films)
 Mobile Suit Gundam (home video distribution for Sunrise; most parts of the franchise license rescued from Bandai Entertainment)
 Ninja Nonsense
 Pita Ten
 Please Teacher! (license rescued from Bandai Entertainment)
 Please Twins! (license rescued from Bandai Entertainment)
 Princess Knight (license rescued from NBC Enterprises)
 Princess Nine (previously under the Lucky Penny label, license rescued from ADV Films)
 Rental Magica (co-license with Kadokawa Pictures USA)
 Revolutionary Girl Utena (license rescued from Central Park Media)
 Sayonara, Zetsubou-Sensei (license rescued from Media Blasters)
 Sengoku Collection (previously under the Lucky Penny label)
 Shingu: Secret of the Stellar Wars
 Sound of the Sky (noted Aniplex master license)
 Space Pirate Mito (previously under the Lucky Penny label, license rescued from Media Blasters)
 Super GALS! Kotobuki Ran (Season 1 license rescued from ADV Films)
 The Third: The Girl with the Blue Eye (co-license with Kadokawa Pictures USA)
 Yakitate!! Japan
 Yondemasuyo, Azazel-san (previously under the Lucky Penny label)

Out of print
 Ai City
 Antique Bakery
 Assemble Insert
 Big Windup! (Season 2) (Season 1 licensed by Funimation)
 Boys Be...
 Cat's Eye (now licensed by Discotek Media)
 Comic Party (now licensed by Discotek Media)
 Dangaizer 3
 Fantastic Detective Labyrinth (previously under the Lucky Penny label)
 Gasaraki (was license rescued from ADV Films)
 Gigantor (was license rescued from NBC Enterprises)
 God Mars (now licensed by Discotek Media)
 Hyakko (previously under the Lucky Penny label)
 K.O. Beast
 Leda: The Fantastic Adventure of Yohko
 Maria-sama ga Miteru (now licensed by Maiden Japan)
 Piano: The Melody of a Young Girl's Heart
 The Rose of Versailles (now licensed by Discotek Media)
 Ristorante Paradiso (previously under the Lucky Penny label)
 Sketchbook ~full color's~
 Space Adventure Cobra (now licensed by Discotek Media)
 Starship Girl Yamamoto Yohko
 Tamayura
 To Heart
 Toward the Terra
 A Town Where You Live
 Umi Monogatari
 Violence Jack (now licensed by Discotek Media)

5 Points Pictures
5 Points Pictures is Right Stuf's distribution division for live action programming. In March 2012, Right Stuf, Inc. established 5 Point Pictures and announced its film distribution agreement with CJ Entertainment.

 Bleak Night (2011)
 Finding Mr. Destiny (2010)
 Glove (2011)
 Going by the Book (2007)
 The Happy Life (2007)
 Moss (2010)
 Penny Pinchers (2011)
 Punch (2011)
 The Suicide Forecast (2011)
 Tazza: The High Rollers (2006)

Former divisions

Critical Mass Video

Critical Mass Video is Right Stuf's former studio for adult anime programming. It offers titles catering to an assortment of different preferences. The label was taken over by Adult Source Media and Ero Anime Store after Right Stuf removed all adult content following the Crunchyroll acquisition.

 Angel Blade
 Angel Blade Punish
 Angel Blade Returns
 Anyone You Can Do... I Can Do Better!
 Beast City
 Black Widow
 Blood Royale
 Blood Shadow
 Bondage 101
 Bondage Mansion
 Campus
 Can Can Bunny Extra
 Chains of Lust
 Classroom of Atonement
 Cool Devices
 Countdown
 Countdown Akira
 Dark
 Debts of Desire
 Demon Warrior
 Destined for Love
 Dragon Pink
 Endless Serenade
 F-Force
 F3: Frantic, Frustrated & Female
 Girl Next Door
 Hardcore Hospital
 Holy Virgins
 Hooligan
 Hot for Teacher
 Hypnolove
 I Love You
 Interspecies Reviewers (license rescued from Funimation)
 The Invisible Stud
 Love Doll
 Maid Service
 Magic Woman M
 Magical Twilight
 Mail Order Maiden
 Maison Plaisir
 Maple Colors
 MeiKing
 Midnight Strike Force
 My Brother's Wife
 Naughty Nurses
 Night Shift Nurses
 Nightmare Campus
 Nurse Me
 Ogenki Clinic Adventures
 Perverse Investigations
 Private Sessions
 Professor Shino's Classes in Seduction
 Punishment
 Rei Rei
 Rxxx: Prescription for Pain
 Sex Ward
 Sexy Sailor Soldiers
 Sibling Secret
 Sinners Paradise
 Slave Market
 Slave Sisters
 Slaves to Passion
 Spotlight
 Stepmother's Sin
 The Story of Little Monica
 Temptation
 T & A Teacher
 Urotsukidōji New Saga
 Variable Geo Neo
 The Venus Files
 Voyeur's Digest
 Wicked Lessons
 Xpress Train
 Xtra Credit

References

External links
 
 

2022 mergers and acquisitions
Anime companies
Companies based in Iowa
Crunchyroll
American companies established in 1987
Entertainment companies established in 1987
Entertainment companies of the United States
Right Stuf International
Privately held companies based in Iowa
Home video companies of the United States
Sony Pictures Television
Sony subsidiaries